A by-election was held for the New South Wales Legislative Assembly electorate of Northumberland on 18 January 1882 because of the resignation of William Turner. Members of parliament were unpaid at the time. Turner was paid by a subscription, said to be £ per member of the Reform League. Subscriptions however proved to be inadequate to support him and he resigned from parliament.

Dates

Candidates

 William Grisdale was an auctioneer and Newcastle Alderman. This was his first time standing for the Legislative Assembly and he died the following month.

 Thomas Hungerford was a pastoralist and a former member for Northumberland who had been defeated by William Turner at the 1880 election.

Result

William Turner resigned.

See also
Electoral results for the district of Northumberland
List of New South Wales state by-elections

References

1882 elections in Australia
New South Wales state by-elections
1880s in New South Wales